Zwift is a massively multiplayer online cycling and running physical training program that enables users to interact, train, and compete in a virtual world.

Zwift was developed by Zwift Inc., which was co-founded by Jon Mayfield, Eric Min, Scott Barger, and Alarik Myrin, in California, United States, North America, in 2014.

The Zwift game was released in its beta version in September 2014, in partnership with TRUE Communications/InGoodTaste, and became a paid product with a fee of US$10 per month in October 2015,. They raised their monthly membership to US$14.99 in November 2017,.

Early history 
In 2012/13, Eric Min had recently sold his previous company, Sakonnet Technology. Min, a lifelong cyclist, found himself confined to riding indoors, and dissatisfied with current interactive options, he believed he could improve on them by "making cycling social". Around this time, Min saw an online post by programmer Jon Mayfield describing a "3D trainer program" he was developing as a hobby project. Min promptly contacted Mayfield, making arrangements to fly to Los Angeles to speak to him; the two agreed to co-found a company around the project.

Beta 
The first virtual world, Jarvis Island, was released as an invite-only beta product on September 30, 2014. The product proved unexpectedly popular, and more than 13,000 applications were received for 1,000 beta places. The launch took place simultaneously in Rapha Clubhouses in London, New York City and San Francisco. By May 2015, Zwift had moved into open beta. A virtual version of the Richmond (Virginia) 2015 UCI Road World Championships Course was introduced on September 3, 2015.

On October 30, 2015, Zwift launched as a fully fledged product with a $10 monthly subscription fee.

Technology 
Zwift allows players to ride their bicycles on stationary trainers while navigating through virtual worlds. Players may cycle freely around the game world and join organized group rides, races, or workouts with other users. Zwift uses ANT+ or Bluetooth Low Energy technologies to transmit data that, in combination with athlete weight and equipment choices, is used to convert the athlete's efforts as speed and power. "Smart" trainers, which include a built-in power meter, permit accuracy in the measurement of watts as well as enabling an immersive technology experience, where resistance is applied or lessened to simulate the gradient encountered on the virtual course. Zwift estimates the power of users on conventional trainers via the user's cadence and the power curve of a wide range of specified trainers.

Zwift was originally available only for users with personal computers. In December 2016, Zwift launched on iOS, and in November 2017, the application became available via Apple TV.  Zwift also includes a mobile app which allows users to change direction, take screenshots, communicate via messaging, use power-ups and follow other athletes. As of January 2018, there were over 550,000 accounts.

Investment 
In December 2018, Zwift raised a Series B investment of $120 million: the investment round was led by Highland Europe, an English investment company. The CEO Eric Min announced the money would be spent on categories expansion, including esports tournaments and further development of Zwift Run. Zwift ranked fifth in Fast Company's 2019 Most Innovative Companies (Sports Sector).

In September 2020, Zwift raised a $450 million minority investment led by investment firm KKR. The funds will be used to push the development of Zwift's core software platform and bring Zwift-designed hardware to market.

Worlds 
There are twelve worlds, or maps, in Zwift. Only one is always available: Watopia, a fictitious island, which has seen some of its expansions lean into fantasy, including dinosaurs and riding into an active volcano. This world also includes a recreation of the famous Alpe d'Huez climb. Eight worlds are rotated according to a predetermined schedule. They are: 

The last two worlds can only be accessed as part of a scheduled event:

Community 
As of June 2021, Zwift had more than 334,000 fans on the social media platform Facebook. Facebook chief executive Mark Zuckerberg used the platform to help continue training after suffering a broken arm. An article in La Velocita called the game's fans "Zwifters". An early partnership between Zwift and ride-sharing site Strava has led to integration with Zwift rides being automatically uploaded to Strava if users enable the function. The first documented Zwift race was held March 3, 2015 organized through Facebook and modeled after weeknight race-riding, a common community event in the road racing subculture of cycling.  One of the earliest groups to offer established racing on Zwift was KISS, which started races in late 2015 and had grown by 2018 to become one of the largest organizers on the platform.

As of September 2022, Zwift users had used the platform to amass:
 Total miles ridden: 3.37 billion
 Total meters climbed: 53 billion
 Total watt hours: 26.9 billion
 Average elevation: 277m
 Average distance: 17.47 miles
 Imperial centuries: 171k
 Ride ons received: 1.11 billion
 Workout activities: 74.3 million
 Weekly races: 1000+
 Peak concurrent users: 47k
 Total moving time: 191 million hours
 Pro athlete accounts: 2,395

Zwift Academy

Cycling
In early 2016 Zwift launched the  program, which utilises the platform to test would-be riders for their suitability for professional bicycle racing. In the inaugural competition, 1,200 cyclists entered, with former marathon runner Leah Thorvilson being crowned the winner and securing a contract with the  team for 2017. The Academy expanded for 2017, adding a men's competition: that year the women's competition was won by ex-triathlete Tanja Erath, who finished first in a field of 2,100 entrants and won a contract with Canyon-SRAM for 2018, whilst the first men's competition was won by former speed skater Ollie Jones, who beat 9,200 other cyclists to secure a place with the  team. The Academy initially centers on an eight-week training program incorporating 16 events, with interval training and virtual group rides and races, before ten riders are selected for the semi-final stage and then a final three are chosen to compete against each other in real life.

Triathlon
In 2018, the Zwift Academy talent identification concept was expanded to include the sport of triathlon. Four athletes were selected to the Specialized Zwift Academy Triathlon Team; Rachael Norfleet (United States), Geert Janssens (Belgium), Golo Philippe Röhrken (Germany), Bex Rimmington (United Kingdom).

Esports Professional Cycling League
In 2019, Zwift appointed Craig Edmondson as CEO at Zwift Esports, and has produced two e-race series events, participants were professional athletes competing on the platform.

The 2019 debut of a professional cycling esports League (KISS Super League), which was announced back in late 2018, with the participation of four UCI Continental men's professional cycling teams confirmed: Team Wiggins Le Col, Canyon–SRAM, Hagens Berman Axeon and Team Dimension Data for Qhubeka U23.

In July 2020, due to the Tour de France being postponed because of the COVID-19 pandemic, Zwift was used to host a virtual tour consisting of six stages.

In December 2020, the first ever UCI Cycling Esports World Championship was held on Zwift.

In March 2023, it was announced that Zwift would be a part of the Olympics Esports Series as the Cycling event.

References

External links
 

Cycling equipment
Sports apps
Fitness games